Darmanto Jatman  (16 August 1942 – 13 January 2018.) was an Indonesian poet and writer. He was an Emeritus Professor at the Faculty of Psychology, Diponegoro University (UNDIP), Semarang. He was known as a humanist, philosopher and poet of Indonesia. 
He gave birth to the establishment of the Faculty of Psychology at UNDIP and became the first professor in the faculty. On 27 July 2007, Susilo Wibowo of UNDIP gave him the title of Professor, exactly a month before he retired, so that he was immediately given the title of Emeritus Professor.

He completed his basic education in Yogyakarta until graduated from the Faculty of Psychology at Gadjah Mada University (UGM), Yogyakarta (1968) . After his S2 (master course) at the Faculty of Psychology, Diponegoro University (UNDIP), Semarang, he became a lecturer in Psychology of Communication from 1 June 1971. He also completed Development Planning at the University College, London (UCL). He taught at ASRI Yogja (Indonesian Institute of the Arts, Yogyakarta), then at the Faculty of Social Science and Political Science, UNDIP. In 1983, co-founded the Faculty of Psychology at Soegijapranata Catholic University, Semarang. He once became the culture editor of ‘’Dinamika Baru, Kampus, Suara Merdeka’’ (activities in Semarang), ‘’Tribun’’ (Jakarta), and up to now lead the campus newspaper UNDIP ‘’Manunggal’’  and magazine FISIP UNDIP ‘’Forum’’. He also once led the Yogya Christian Theatre and the Yogya Christian Literature Study Club. In 1980 he held the Adelaide Festival, Australia. And in 1983 held the International Poetry Festival in Rotterdam, Netherlands.

Publications

References

External links
goodreads Darmanto Jatman
 Suara Merdeka
 Biography of Jatman, Darmanto | Southeast Asia Digital Library

1942 births
2018 deaths
20th-century Indonesian poets
People from Jakarta
Indonesian writers
Indonesian male poets
20th-century male writers
Diponegoro University alumni